The RIT Tigers represented the Rochester Institute of Technology in College Hockey America during the 2013-14 NCAA Division I women's ice hockey season. In only their second year at the Division I level, the Tigers won the CHA Tournament, defeating the Mercyhurst Lakers. NCAA rules prohibited RIT from participation in the NCAA National Championship Tournament, because teams moving to Division I have a two-year probationary period.

On December 14, 2013, RIT played Clarkson at Frontier Field, an outdoor venue in Rochester, NY.

Standings

Recruiting

Roster

2013–14 Tigers

Schedule

|-
!colspan=12 style=| Regular Season

|-
!colspan=12 style=| CHA Tournament

Awards and honors

Junior Ali Binnington was named the CHA Goaltender of the Year. Binnington went 14-9-2 with a 1.82 Goals Against Average, a .940 Save Percentage and six shutouts. Binnington was also the MVP of the CHA Tournament.

Junior captain Defender Lindsay Grigg was named to the All-CHA Second Team.

References

RIT
RIT Tigers women's ice hockey seasons
Sports in Rochester, New York